Killer Bud is an American comedy film released in 2001. It was Robert Stack's final film prior to his death in 2003.

External links

Rottentomatoes.com review
Apolloguide.com review

2001 films
2001 comedy films
American comedy films
Trimark Pictures films
2000s English-language films
2000s American films